Morten Jensen (born 11 April 1951) is a Norwegian sailor. He competed in the 470 event at the 1976 Summer Olympics.

References

External links
 

1951 births
Living people
Norwegian male sailors (sport)
Olympic sailors of Norway
Sailors at the 1976 Summer Olympics – 470
Sportspeople from Oslo